Released August 1, 2006, Him is the fifth studio album from Christian rock singer and Stryper frontman, Michael Sweet.

The album features a collection of traditional hymns arranged and re-written by Sweet himself. Sweet made a music video of "Take My Life" for the biblical movie, One Night with the King, based on the story of Esther. Sweet's daughter, Ellena Rae Sweet, can be seen dancing as a ballerina in the video.

Track listing
 "Calvary"
 "Every Hour"
 "I Know"
 "Alleluia"
 "I’ll Remember You"
 "Gilead"
 "Still"
 "Take My Life"
 "Surrender"
 "Oh Holy Night"

Personnel
 Michael Sweet - lead vocals, acoustic and electric guitars
 Kenny Lewis - keys
 Peter Vantine - strings, piano, keys
 LeRoix Hampton - strings, piano, keys
 Lou Spagnola - bass
 Tracy Ferrie - bass
 Dickie Paris - drums
 Chris Miles - bass on "Oh Holy Night"

References 

2006 albums
Michael Sweet albums